Jupiter was king of the gods in the ancient Roman religion. Numerous temples were dedicated to him in Rome and throughout the Roman Empire. Notable examples include:

In Rome:
Temple of Jupiter Custos (Jupiter the Guardian), uncertain site
Temple of Jupiter Feretrius (Jupiter of the Spoils), uncertain site; the first temple built in Rome
Temple of Jupiter Optimus Maximus (Jupiter Best and Greatest), on the Capitoline Hill so also known as the Temple of Jupiter Capitolinus; the most important temple in Rome
Temple of Jupiter Stator (8th century BC) (Jupiter the Unmoving), in the Roman Forum; destroyed in the Great Fire of Rome
Temple of Jupiter Stator (2nd century BC), in the Campus Martius
Temple of Jupiter Victor, ruins on the Palatine Hill which until 1956 were thought to be a temple to Jupiter, but are now identified as the Temple of Apollo Palatinus
Elsewhere:
Temple of Jupiter, Baalbek, in Heliopolis Syriaca, modern Lebanon; the largest temple dedicated to Jupiter
Temple of Jupiter, Damascus, modern Syria
Temple of Jupiter Olympius, Athens; dedicated to Zeus, the Greek equivalent of Jupiter
Temple of Jupiter (Pompeii), buried by the eruption of Mount Vesuvius in 79 AD
Temple of Jupiter (Silifke), modern Turkey
Temple of Jupiter, Split, modern Croatia
Temple of Jupiter Anxur, in Terracina
Jupiter Temple, a summit in the Grand Canyon, USA
Temple of Jupiter Capitolinus, atop the ruins of the Jerusalem Temple, built probably after the Bar Kokhba Revolt of 132–135 CE